Nils Stolzlechner (born 5 May 1962) is an Austrian-born American former ski jumper.

Stolzlechner made his international debut at the FIS Nordic World Ski Championships 1982 in Oslo, where he reached #44 in the Individual normal hill competition and #54 in the Individual large hill competition. In the Team large hill competition he partnered with Jeff Hastings, Reed Zuehlke, and John Broman, and reached fifth place.

His first outing in the FIS Ski Jumping World Cup was on 26 March 1983 in Planica, where he reached 12th place and scored World Cup points. In the next two seasons he competed (unsuccessfully) in the Four Hills Tournament, and scored an eighth place on the normal hill on 8 January 1985, in Cortina d'Ampezzo. This was the highest individual placing of his career. At the end of the 1984-1985 season he had reached a joint 49th place. He was not selected for the 1984 Winter Olympics, though he was reportedly one of the top skiers in the US that season.

In 1985 he was again a member of the US Nordic Ski Team. At the FIS Nordic World Ski Championships 1985 in Seefeld in Tirol he reached #25 on the normal hill, and with  Mark Konopacke, Rick Mewborn, and  Mike Holland reached #5 in the team event.

He participated in the Four Hills Tournament in 1985-1986, but unsuccessfully, and ended his ski jumping career. Afterward he was a professional kitesurfer, and after retiring from competitive sports began a career in hotel management.

References

External links
 

Living people
1962 births
American male ski jumpers
Austrian male ski jumpers